Abdoul Karim Yoda (born 25 October 1988) is a French professional footballer  who plays as a midfielder for Saudi club Al-Wehda. He is of Ivorian and Burkinabe descent.

Club career
Born in Annemasse, Yoda joined Servette FC's youth system in 2000, aged 11. He made his senior debuts in 2006, and scored his first professional goal in the following year.

In June 2009 Yoda moved to fellow league team FC Sion. He appeared regularly in his first two campaigns, but fell in the pecking order during his two last.

On 2 September 2013 Yoda moved to Romania, signing a three-year deal with FC Astra Giurgiu He appeared in 21 matches during his only season, scoring twice.

On 14 July 2014 Yoda moved teams and countries again, by agreeing to a two-year deal with La Liga side Getafe CF. He made his debut in the competition on 25 September, starting in a 0–2 away loss against RCD Espanyol.

Yoda scored his first goals in the main category of Spanish football on 20 October, netting a brace in a 2–1 away win against Real Sociedad. On 31 January 2017, he moved to Segunda División club UD Almería on loan until the end of the season, with Chuli moving in the opposite direction.

On 22 November 2017, Yoda was loaned to CF Reus Deportiu in the second level, until the following June, and signed a permanent two-year contract the following 31 July 2018. However, he was one of the four players who were not registered for the new season due to the club's wage limit, and left the club after it was expelled by the LFP the following January.

In February 2019, Yoda signed a two-and-a-half-year contract with Ukrainian Premier League side FC Karpaty Lviv. On 23 July, however, he returned to Spain and its second division, after agreeing to a two-year deal with Racing de Santander.

On 23 January 2020, Al-Hazem has signed with Karim Yoda from Racing de Santander .

On 17 August 2021, Yoda joined Al-Wehda.

Honours

Club
Sion
 Swiss Cup: 2010–11

Astra Giurgiu
 Cupa României: 2013–14

Al-Hazem
 MS League: 2020–21

References

External links

1988 births
Living people
People from Annemasse
Sportspeople from Haute-Savoie
French footballers
French sportspeople of Ivorian descent
Association football midfielders
Swiss Super League players
Servette FC players
FC Sion players
Liga I players
FC Astra Giurgiu players
La Liga players
Segunda División players
Ukrainian Premier League players
Saudi Professional League players
Saudi First Division League players
Getafe CF footballers
UD Almería players
CF Reus Deportiu players
FC Karpaty Lviv players
Racing de Santander players
Al-Hazem F.C. players
Al-Wehda Club (Mecca) players
French expatriate footballers
Expatriate footballers in Switzerland
Expatriate footballers in Romania
Expatriate footballers in Spain
Expatriate footballers in Ukraine
Expatriate footballers in Saudi Arabia
French expatriate sportspeople in Switzerland
French expatriate sportspeople in Romania
French expatriate sportspeople in Spain
French expatriate sportspeople in Ukraine
French expatriate sportspeople in Saudi Arabia
Footballers from Auvergne-Rhône-Alpes